Hilda Vaughn (December 27, 1898 – December 28, 1957) was an American actress of the stage, film, radio, and television.

Early years 
Hilda Weiller Strouse, the daughter of Mr. and Mrs. Eli Strouse, Vaughn attended Vassar College and the American Academy of Dramatic Arts.

Career 
Vaughn frequently played a "pleb", or a commoner, in the films she acted in (waitresses, maids, charwomen, governesses, and saleswomen). A fixture at MGM in the sound era of the early 1930s, she acted in more than 50 films. Her most notable films were 1933's Dinner at Eight where she was memorable as Jean Harlow's blackmailing maid, as well as Today We Live (1933), Chasing Yesterday (1935), and Charlie Chan at the Wax Museum (1940).

She appeared on Broadway, and in 1924 toured as the lead in Rain based on a story by W. Somerset Maugham. Her "smoldering quality" came back to Broadway two years later in The Seed of the Brute at the Little Theatre. She also appeared on Broadway in Glory Hallelujah.

After making several films, Vaughn was part of the Hollywood blacklist. She returned to the stage in 1942 to play the lead in Only the Heart at the American Actors Company. In 1943 she appeared in William Saroyan's Get Away Old Man, followed by several other appearances, including playing the nurse to Judith Anderson's Medea and the mother in The Devil's Disciple by George Bernard Shaw. She was also known for her concert readings of plays.

Death 
On December 28, 1957, Vaughn died in Baltimore.

Filmography

Three Live Ghosts (1929) - Peggy Woofers
Manslaughter (1930) - Louise Evans
A Tailor Made Man (1931) - (uncredited)
It's a Wise Child (1931) - Alice Peabody
Susan Lenox (Her Fall and Rise) (1931) - Astrid Ohlin
Ladies of the Big House (1931) - Millie
The Phantom of Crestwood (1932) - Mrs. Carter
No Other Woman (1933) - Miss LeRoy - Governess
Today We Live (1933) - Eleanor
No Marriage Ties (1933) - Fanny Olmstead, Foster's Secretary
Dinner at Eight (1933) - Tina
Anne of Green Gables (1934) - Mrs. Blewett
The Wedding Night (1935) - Hezzie Jones
Straight from the Heart (1935) - Miss Nellie
Chasing Yesterday (1935) - Collette - the Slavey (uncredited)
Men Without Names (1935) - Nurse Simpson
I Live My Life (1935) - Miss Ann Morrison
The Trail of the Lonesome Pine (1936) - Gaptown Teacher (uncredited)
Everybody's Old Man (1936) - Maid
Gentle Julia (1936) - Telephone Operator (uncredited)
Captain January (1936) - Dress Saleswoman (uncredited)
The Witness Chair (1936) - Anna Yifnick (uncredited)
Half Angel (1936) - Bertha
And Sudden Death (1936) - Prison Inmate (uncredited)
The Accusing Finger (1936) - Maid
Charlie Chan at the Opera (1936) - Agnes - Wardrobe Woman (uncredited)
Banjo On My Knee  (1936) - Gurtha
Danger – Love at Work (1937) - Pemberton's Maid
Nothing Sacred (1937) - Mrs. Cartwright - Chief Ranger (uncredited)
Maid's Night Out (1938) - Mary - Harrison's Maid
Charlie Chan at the Wax Museum (1940) - Mrs. Rocke
Confirm or Deny (1941) - Receptionist (scenes deleted)

References

External links
 
 
  
 
 
 

 

1898 births
1957 deaths
Actresses from Baltimore
20th-century American actresses
American film actresses
American stage actresses